MAX Yellow, also known as Route 304 or the Southwest BRT, is a bus rapid transit line in Calgary, Alberta. Part of Calgary Transit's MAX network, it largely travels north-south along Crowchild Trail SW, 14 Street SW, and 24 Street SW. It connects CTrain stations in downtown Calgary to the southwest quadrant.

Stations and route
MAX Yellow begins in the southwest at Woodpark Boulevard. It travels northeast to the Southwest Transitway where it meets MAX Teal. After stopping at Mount Royal University, it travels north along Crowchild Trail to Bow Trail. MAX Yellow terminates in Downtown Calgary, connecting to the Red Line, Blue Line, and MAX Purple.

See also 

 MAX Orange
 MAX Teal
 MAX Purple
 MAX
 Calgary Transit

References

Yellow